Branko Nešović (Serbian Cyrillic: Бранко Нешовић; 11 July 1930 – 23 November 2002) was a Serbian footballer and doctor.

He was the team doctor during Red Star Belgrade's famed 1991 European Cup win.

References

External links
 Obituary
 NIN article

1930 births
2002 deaths
Footballers from Belgrade
Serbian footballers
Association football defenders
Red Star Belgrade footballers
Red Star Belgrade non-playing staff
Yugoslav First League players
University of Belgrade Faculty of Medicine alumni